Letnyaya Zolotitsa is a rural locality (a village) in Pertominskoye Rural Settlement of Primorsky District, Arkhangelsk Oblast, Russia. The population was 158 as of 2010. There are 4 streets.

Geography 
Letnyaya Zolotitsa is located 310 km northwest of Arkhangelsk (the district's administrative centre) by road. Pushlakhta is the nearest rural locality.

References 

Rural localities in Primorsky District, Arkhangelsk Oblast
Onezhsky Uyezd
Road-inaccessible communities of Russia